Deinandra greeneana is a rare North American species of plants in the tribe Madieae within the family Asteraceae.

Deinandra greeneana has been found only in the state of Baja California in northwestern Mexico. The species was thought for many years to be restricted to Guadalupe Island, 400 km (150 miles) west of the mainland, but it was later discovered on the Pacific Coast of the Baja California Peninsula southwest of Ensenada.

Deinandra greeneana is an annual herb up to 120 cm (48 inches) tall. It produces many yellow flower heads, each with both disc florets and ray florets.

Subspecies
 Deinandra greeneana subsp. greeneana - Guadalupe Island 
 Deinandra greeneana subsp. peninsularis (Moran) B.G.Baldwin - mainland Baja California

References

greeneana
Endemic flora of Mexico
Flora of Baja California
Flora of Mexican Pacific Islands
Plants described in 1890